Una spina nel cuore, internationally released as A Thorn in the Heart, is a 1986 Italian romance-drama film directed by Alberto Lattuada. It is loosely based on the novel with the same title by Piero Chiara.

Cast 
 Anthony Delon as Guido
 Sophie Duez (it) as Caterina Marini
 Antonella Lualdi as  Adelaide Biotti
 Gastone Moschin as Doctor Trigona
 Leonardo Treviglio  as  Tibiletti
 Carola Stagnaro  as Teresita
 Angelo Infanti as Roberto Dionisotti

References

External links

1986 films
Films directed by Alberto Lattuada
1986 romantic drama films
Italian romantic drama films
Miasino
1980s Italian films
1980s Italian-language films